Fan Dance is the ninth studio album from American singer and songwriter Sam Phillips.

Track listing

Personnel
 Sam Phillips – vocals, guitar, piano
 T Bone Burnett – piano, bass, tambourine
 Marc Ribot – guitar, banjo, quattro banjo guitar, Optigan
 Dave Rawlings – piano
 Van Dyke Parks – harpsichord, string arrangements
 Gillian Welch – vocals, bass
 Rick Will – bass
 Martin Tillman – cello
 Carla Azar – traps, maracas, drums
 Jim Keltner – banjo, cymbals, drums

Production
 T Bone Burnett – producer, mixing
 David Bither – executive producer
 Mike Piersante – recording engineer, mixing
 Christopher Sirois – assistant recording engineer
 Okhee Kim – assistant recording engineer
 Chris Reynolds – assistant recording engineer
 Doug Boehm – assistant recording engineer
 Gavin Lurssen – mastering

References 

2001 albums
Sam Phillips (musician) albums
Albums produced by T Bone Burnett
Nonesuch Records albums